Credito Agrario Bresciano S.p.A. (CAB) was an Italian bank based in Brescia, Italy.

History
In 1991, CAB acquired Banca Carnica and Banca Zanone. In 1993, CAB acquired GAIC SIM.

In 1998 the bank merged with Banca San Paolo di Brescia to form Banca Lombarda Group. More specifically, Banco di San Giorgio, a subsidiary of CAB, remained as a separate entity, while the former branches of CAB and Banca San Paolo di Brescia were merged into Banco di Brescia on 1 January 1999.

References

External links

 Fondazione Credito Agrario Bresciano 

Banks established in 1883
Italian companies established in 1883
Banks disestablished in 1998
Italian companies disestablished in 1998
Defunct banks of Italy
Companies based in Brescia
History of UBI Banca